Walesby is a village and civil parish in the West Lindsey district of Lincolnshire, England. The population of the civil parish at the 2011 census was 249. Tealby parish lies to the south-east.

The name 'Walesby' is thought to mean 'farm/settlement of Valr' or another suggestion is 'farm/settlement of the Britons'.

St Mary's is an Arts and Crafts style Church designed by the architect Temple Moore in 1913.
The church was shut after the 2008 Lincolnshire earthquake when a large crack appeared in the tower and masonry fell inside the church.  St Mary's was also damaged in the 1930s when a hurricane dislodged its 'candle snuffer' spire resulting in its eventual removal.

In the 1930s an earlier church, All Saints', was renovated after it fell into disuse. Now known as the "Ramblers Church" it features a 1951 stained glass window detailing walkers and cyclists. The Viking Way passes close to All Saints.

References

External links

Villages in Lincolnshire
Civil parishes in Lincolnshire
West Lindsey District